The Men's double trap took place on 11 April 2018 at the Belmont Shooting Centre. There was a qualification in which the top 6 athletes qualified for the finals.

Results

Qualification

Finals

References

External links

Shooting at the 2018 Commonwealth Games